Taunay is a surname. Notable people with the surname include:

Adrien Taunay the Younger (1803–1828), French painter and draftsman
Afonso d'Escragnolle Taunay (1876–1958), Brazilian writer, politician and noble
Alfredo d'Escragnolle Taunay, Viscount of Taunay (1843–1899), French Brazilian writer, musician, military engineer, historian, politician, etc.
Auguste Marie Taunay (1768–1824), French sculptor
Félix Taunay, Baron of Taunay (1795–1881), French Brazilian painter
Nicolas-Antoine Taunay (1755–1830), French painter